Danilo Gomes Cintra (born 28 May 1985) is a Brazilian football player who is a free agent.

Club career
He made his Primeira Liga debut for Académica de Coimbra on 15 August 2011 in a game against União de Leiria.

Honours
Académica de Coimbra
Taça de Portugal: 2011–12

References

1985 births
Sportspeople from Rio de Janeiro (state)
Living people
Brazilian footballers
Centro de Futebol Zico players
Quissamã Futebol Clube players
Macaé Esporte Futebol Clube players
Associação Académica de Coimbra – O.A.F. players
Brazilian expatriate footballers
Expatriate footballers in Portugal
Primeira Liga players
G.D. Chaves players
Liga Portugal 2 players
Associação Desportiva Recreativa e Cultural Icasa players
Associação Desportiva Cabofriense players
Central Sport Club players
Association football midfielders
People from São João da Barra